The lowland white-eye (Zosterops meyeni) is a species of bird in the family Zosteropidae.

It is endemic to the northern part of the Philippines and the Taiwanese islands of Lüdao and Lanyu.

Its natural habitat is subtropical or tropical moist lowland forest.

References

lowland white-eye
Birds of Luzon
Birds of Mindoro
Fauna of Batanes
lowland white-eye
lowland white-eye
Taxonomy articles created by Polbot